Louis John Copp Ford (18 May 1914 – 20 September 1980) was a Welsh professional footballer. He made 41 appearances for Cardiff City in all competitions before his career was ended following the outbreak of World War II.

References

1914 births
1980 deaths
Footballers from Cardiff
Welsh footballers
Cardiff City F.C. players
English Football League players
Association football defenders
Wales amateur international footballers